is a TV station affiliated with All-Nippon News Network (ANN) in Niigata, Niigata Prefecture.  It was established on March 8, 1983 and began broadcasting from October 1, 1983.

The station has been branded as ux since 2006, after the last two letters of the station's call sign. The station's current slogan is YOU&ME&UX.

History
Niigata Television Network 21 was established on March 7, 1983 and commenced transmissions on October 1, 1983. Prior to that, TV Asahi programming was seen on NST. NST was affiliated to FNN, NNN and ANN, before alleviating the station's network schedule with the launch of TNN (now TeNY), which took over the NNN affiliation in 1981 and NT21, which took over the ANN affiliation in 1983. By then, Niigata has four network stations.

Digital terrestrial transmissions commenced on August 1, 2006. To mark the occasion, NT21 was rebranded as ux. Aside from airing TV Asahi shows, the station also currently airs a few TV Tokyo shows, since the network does not have a station in most prefectures.

TV channel

Digital Television 
 Yahiko 23ch JOUX-DTV 3 kW

Tandem office 
 Takada 39ch
 Mikawa 49ch
 Tsunan-Kamigō 22ch
 Koide 32ch 
 Kanose 23ch 
 Itoigawa-Ōno 31ch
 Tsunan 31ch
 Tsugawa 49ch
 Ryōtsu 38ch 
 Aikawa 34ch 
 Yamato 38ch 
 Takachi 23ch 
 Arai 49ch
 Murakami 33ch 
 Sotokaifu 34ch 
 Yuzawa 23ch
 Tsunan-Tanaka 23ch
 Itoigawa-Hayakawa 38ch
 Sumon 38ch
 Muramatsu 49ch
 Sekikawa 49ch
 Tochio 49ch
 Muikamachi 38ch  
 Myōkōkōgen 49ch
 Ōmi 31ch
 Takayanagi 41ch
 Kawaguchi 23ch

Programs

External links

 The official website of Niigata Television Network 21 

All-Nippon News Network
Television stations in Japan
Television channels and stations established in 1983
Mass media in Niigata (city)
Companies based in Niigata Prefecture